Waverley Falcons is a member club of the NBL1 South based in Melbourne, Victoria. The club fields both a men's and women's team. The club is a division of Waverley Basketball Association (WBA), the major administrative basketball organisation in the region. The Falcons play their home games at Waverley Basketball Centre.

Club history
The Waverley Basketball Association was formed in 1976 with the building of the Jordanville Community Centre. Waverley began with one court at the current location and grew over a number of years with additional competitions played at Highvale Secondary College, Mazenod College, Mount Waverley Secondary College, and Wheelers Hill Secondary College. The Waverley Falcons, the representative arm of the Waverley Basketball Association for male and female players, was formed in 1982.

Waverley first tasted success in 1994 with the women's team winning the Country Victorian Invitational Basketball League (CVIBL) Championship. The men's team were crowned back-to-back champions of the Big V State Championship division in 2010 and 2011.

In October 2018, WBA's Big V teams were entered into the newly-established NBL1 for the 2019 season. The NBL1 South season did not go ahead in 2020 due to the COVID-19 pandemic.

References

External links
WBA's official website

Big V teams
Basketball teams established in 1982
1982 establishments in Australia
Basketball teams in Melbourne
Sport in the City of Monash